Johnny Roe (26 March 1938 – 23 April 2017) was an Irish jockey who competed in Flat racing. Roe was Irish flat racing Champion Jockey on nine occasions and won the 1000 Guineas Stakes in 1975 on Nocturnal Spree.
He died in Dublin on 23 April 2017, aged 79.

References

1938 births
2017 deaths
Irish jockeys